"Disco Clone" is a song by American singer Cristina and written by Ronald Melrose. It was released as a single on ZE Records in 1978.

Background

"Disco Clone" was written by Ronald Melrose, a classmate of Cristina's from Harvard University. Her boyfriend Michael Zilkha wanted to take advantage of the disco boom and record the song. She called it "the worst song I have ever heard" and decided to perform it as a "Brechtian pastiche".

Tony de Portago, a friend of Cristina's, was the first to record the male vocals for "Disco Clone", but his were thrown out as sounding "too foreign" and "insufficiently jaded". Anthony Haden-Guest recorded the part in both English and French, which appear on song's first release. Kevin Kline, a little known actor at the time, appears on the re-release. Tom Moulton was approached to mix the track, but he did not want to be involved with something that mocked disco. Island Records founder Chris Blackwell mixed it instead.

The song's writer, Ronald Melrose, later became an arranger and musical director on Broadway shows, including Jersey Boys.

Composition

"Disco Clone" uses a common disco rhythm, with a four-on-the-floor bass drum pattern and prominent hi-hat. It features a large string section, with 24 violinists double tracked. The song's lyrics poke fun at the idea of men wanting to hook up with attractive women who look alike.

Release
The original version of "Disco Clone" had a limited release of 1,500 twelve-inch singles, the first release by Zilkha's fledgling label ZE Records. It received a re-release shortly after. The re-release includes a remix that was later retitled "The Ballad of Immoral Manufacture", in reference to "The Ballad of Immoral Earnings" from Brecht's The Threepenny Opera. The single was not commercially successful.

Track listings
Original 12" release
 "Disco Clone" (English Version) – 4:13
 "Disco Clone" (French Version) – 4:03

12" re-release
 "Disco Clone" (Disco Mix) – 7:43
 "Disco Clone" (Single Version) – 4:07
 "Disco Clone" (Clone Instrumental) – 8:14

References

External links
 "Disco Clone" at ZE Records

1978 debut singles
American disco songs
Songs about dancing
Songs about disco